Amiri is a name of Persian, Lurish, Kurdish, Hebrew and Arabic origins. It is primarily an Iranian name of Arabic origin (see Emir) that means "Kingdom" or "Royal".

Notable people with the name and surname include:

 Ali Amiri (historian) (1857–1923), Ottoman historian
 Ali Amiri (Afghan footballer) (born 1985), German-Afghan footballer
 Ali Amiri (Iranian footballer) (born 1988), Iranian footballer for Rah Ahan
 Mike Amiri, Iranian-American fashion designer and founder of the brand Amiri 
 Nadiem Amiri, German-Afghan footballer
 Ramona Amiri (born 1980), Iranian-Canadian Miss World Canada 2005
 Shahram Amiri (1977–2016), Iranian nuclear scientist
 Shamsuddin Amiri (born 1985), Afghan football player
 Vahid Amiri, Iranian footballer, formerly for Team Melli (Iranian National Football Team)
 Zubayr Amiri, Afghan footballer